Rafael Alfaro Ferracuti (born 4 February 1992, in San Salvador) is a Salvadoran swimmer who competed in the Men's 400m individual medley. At the 2012 Summer Olympics he finished 35th overall in the heats in the Men's 400 metre individual medley.

He also competed at the 2015 Pan American Games.

He is the nephew of Piero Ferracuti, who also competed for BYU and was in the 1976 Olympics for El Salvador.

References

1992 births
Living people
Salvadoran male swimmers
Male medley swimmers
Olympic swimmers of El Salvador
Swimmers at the 2012 Summer Olympics
Swimmers at the 2015 Pan American Games
Pan American Games competitors for El Salvador
20th-century Salvadoran people
21st-century Salvadoran people